Herbert Freemont Hardacre (7 March 1861 – 5 March 1938) was a politician in Queensland, Australia. He was a Member of the Queensland Legislative Assembly from 1893 until 1919.

Politics
Herbert Hardacre was elected to the Queensland Legislative Assembly having won Leichhardt at the 1893 colonial election as the Labor Party candidate. He was Secretary for Public Lands and Secretary for Agriculture from 1 December 1899 to 7 December 1899. He was Secretary for Public Instruction from 1 June 1915 to 9 September 1919. He held Leichhardt until he resigned on 14 October 1919 in order to take up an appointment in the Land Court. Labor candidate Tom Foley won the resulting by-election on 20 December 1919.

Later life

Hardacre died in 1938 and is buried in Balmoral Cemetery.

See also
 Members of the Queensland Legislative Assembly, 1893–1896; 1896-1899; 1899-1902; 1902-1904; 1904-1907; 1907-1908; 1908-1909; 1909-1912; 1912-1915; 1915-1918; 1918-1920

References

1861 births
1938 deaths
Members of the Queensland Legislative Assembly
Politicians from Dayton, Ohio
American emigrants to Australia
Burials in Balmoral Cemetery, Brisbane